Centerville Independent School District may refer to:

 Centerville Independent School District (Leon County, Texas)
 Centerville Independent School District (Trinity County, Texas)